Moon Moon Sen, also credited as Moonmoon Sen (born Srimati Sen; 28 March 1954), is an Indian actress, known for her works in Hindi, Bengali, Malayalam, Kannada, Telugu, Tamil, and Marathi films. She eventually starred in Bollywood films. She has appeared in 60 films and 40 television series. She has received Andhra Pradesh state Nandi Award for Best Supporting Actress in 1987, for her role in the film Sirivennela.

Early life
Moon Moon Sen was born in Calcutta (present-day Kolkata) to popular Bengali actress Suchitra Sen and Dibanath Sen. Her father, of Ballygunge Place, was the son of one of the wealthiest businessmen of Kolkata, Adinath Sen. Her great-grandfather Dinanath Sen was the Diwan or a Minister of the Maharaja of Tripura.

She was educated at Loreto Convent, Shillong and at Loreto House, Calcutta. She completed her graduation from Somerville College, Oxford and received her master's degree in Comparative Literature from Jadavpur University, Calcutta.

As a child, Sen learnt drawing from Jamini Roy, one of India's greatest artists. She loves paintings and collecting antiques. In an interview in 2000, she said she taught at Ballygunge Govt High School for a year and then taught graphics at Chitrabani, a school teaching film techniques. She was also active in social work and even thought about adopting a baby, even before she was married. Sen taught English at a well known Boys' school (Ballygunge Govt. High School) in Kolkata before joining films.

Career

Acting career
Moon Moon Sen started her career in films and television after marriage and motherhood. She made her debut in Andar Baahar (1984). Her daring role in that film apparently created a storm of controversy.

She had also starred in a suspense thriller 100 Days with Madhuri Dixit. After Zakhmi Dil (1994) she did not appear in films until 2003 when she starred in an unsuccessful thriller Kucch To Hai. She could not match success of her mother. She'd acted in a Telugu movie Sirivennela directed by the legendary Telugu director K. Viswanath.

Before and after entering the film industry, she appeared alone (or with her daughters) in some modelling assignments. She notably modelled for soap ads which were quite controversial in the 1980s. Apart from doing some television serials, she also did couple of Bengali tele-films.

Sen said she would bare all even at 70.
"Age is not important, the attitude is. Sophia is the ultimate glam girl who can manage to look beautiful in such a picture even now. But yes, India too has beautiful women like Rekha and Hema Malini who can carry such a thing out with aplomb. In fact, I wouldn't mind myself if the shoot is done aesthetically and with taste."

Her film My Karma (2004),  directed by Korak Day earned her international praise, as the film received international awards and recognition for her as a "tough and sweet Indian wife, standing as a rock behind her husband".

She is now doing a few films at a time. She is also apparently writing a cookbook in Bengali, which is yet to be published.

Political career
She joined All India Trinamool Congress in March 2014 and won in 2014 Lok Sabha Polls from Bankura constituency, where she defeated CPI(M)'s nine-time MP, Basudeb Acharia. In 2019, she lost the Asansol Lok Sabha constituency election to Babul Supriyo of BJP.

In 2015, Moon Moon Sen in an interview said 'I think we should give him (Modi) a chance. He has done a very good job winning all those votes and we have to give him a chance as a Prime Minister.' Though her party distanced itself from the statement and said that it is her own view and is certainly not the view of the party.

Personal life
Moon Moon Sen married in 1978 to a descendant of the erstwhile royal family of Tripura. They have two daughters, Raima and Riya, who also pursued a career in acting. She has high regards for her husband for his consistent support of her professional acting career.

Her late mother-in-law, Ila Devi, daughter of Indira Raje, the princess of Cooch Behar and an elder sister of Gayatri Devi, the Maharani of Jaipur.

Deeply religious, in spite of her bohemian screen image, Moon Moon Sen is committed to family life and grieved at her mother Suchitra Sen's passing away on 17 January 2014 due to a heart attack. She immersed the ashes of her mother ritualistically in the Ganges on Wednesday, 29 January 2014. The prayers was attended by dignitaries, like West Bengal Chief Minister Mamata Banerjee and close friends and family who had missed the funeral, a hurried affair after five hours of death as per the last wishes of the dying actress.

Awards
Nandi Award for Best Supporting Actress – Sirivennela (1987)
Kalakendra Screen Award 
Bharat Nirman Award 
Kalakar Awards.

Filmography

Hindi

 Andar Baahar (1984) as Reema
 Musafir (1986)
 Mohabbat Ki Kasam (1986) as Radha
 Jaal (1986)
 Sheesha (1986) as Manisha Prakash
 Pyaar Ki Jeet (1987) as Rani sahiba
 Majnu (1987)
 Maashuka (1987)
 Woh Phir Aayegi (1988)
 Be Lagaam (1988)
 Mil Gayee Manzil Mujhe (1989)
 Tere Bina Kya Jeena (1989)
 Ek Din Achanak (1989)
 Apna Desh Paraye Log (1989) as Journalist Sunita
 Pathar Ke Insan (1990) as Dancer
 Lekin... (1991) as Pammi
 Jeevan Ek Sanghursh (1990)
 Bahaar Aane Tak (1990) as Renu
 Iraada (1991) Geeta Sen, Journalist
Yeh Aag Kab Bujhegi (1991)
 100 Days (1991) as Rama
 Vishkanya (1991) as Mrs. Sonal Vikram Singh
 Waqt Ka Badshah (1992)
 Pyaar Ka Saudagar (1992) as Monalisa Sinha (Manorama)
 Zakhmi Rooh (1993) as Seema/Reema
 Zakhmi Dil (1994) as Mala
 Abhay (1994)
 Sautela Bhai (1996) as Sheena
 Kucch To Hai (2003) as Madam Sexena
 Nil Nirjane (2003)
 Love at Times Square (2003) as Sweety's mother
 Taj Mahal: A Monument of Love (2003)
 My Karma (2004) as Mrs. Mullik
 It Was Raining That Night (2005)
 Bow Barracks Forever (2007) as Rosi

Bengali
 Chorus (1974)
 Rajbadhu (1982)
 Rajeswari (1983)
 Baidurya Rahasya (1984)
 Ajantay (1984)
 Pujarini (1984)
 Antarale (1985)
 Amar Kantak (1986)
 Anjali (1987)
 Apon Ghorey (1987)
 Tumi Kato Sundar (1988)
Nishi Trishna (1989)
 Byabodhan (1990)
 Gajamukuta (1991)
 Hirer Angti (1992)
 Mahashay (1992)
 Sopan (1994)
 Neel Nirjane (2003)
 Buno Haansh (2014)
 Bhobishyoter Bhoot (2019)

Malayalam
  Angaadi (1982)
 Chiriyo Chiri (1982)
 Aval Kaathirunnu Avanum (1986)
 Gentle Man Security  (1994)

Kannada
 Yuga Purusha (1989)
 Vaishakada Dinagalu (1993)
 Mangalya Bandhana (1993)

Telugu
Sirivennela (1986)
Majnu (1987)

Tamil
 12B (2001) Sulo, Jo's mother

English
 My Karma (2004) as Mrs. Mallik

Television
 Paliyathachan - Malayalam serial
 Rishtey - Hindi Serial
 Shudhu Tomari Jonyo - Bengali serial

References

Further reading
Shoma A. Chatterjee. "Moon Moon Sen: Back in the Spotlight", Screen (part of The Indian Express group), 24 November 2000.  An article based on an interview with Moon Moon Sen, discussing her career and her private life.

External links

1948 births
Politicians from Kolkata
Indian film actresses
Actresses in Bengali cinema
Actresses in Hindi cinema
Actresses in Kannada cinema
Actresses in Telugu cinema
Actresses in Tamil cinema
Living people
Loreto College, Kolkata alumni
University of Calcutta alumni
Jadavpur University alumni
Kalakar Awards winners
India MPs 2014–2019
Indian actor-politicians
Lok Sabha members from West Bengal
People from Bankura district
Women in West Bengal politics
Actresses from Kolkata
21st-century Indian actresses
21st-century Indian women politicians
21st-century Indian politicians
20th-century Indian actresses
Actresses in Malayalam cinema
Actresses in Malayalam television
Actresses in Hindi television
Bengali television actresses
Trinamool Congress politicians from West Bengal
Women members of the Lok Sabha
Alumni of Somerville College, Oxford